Guru Dutt Films Pvt. Ltd. was an Indian film production company, founded by actor-director Guru Dutt in 1955. Guru Dutt Films, along with the Guru Dutt team, saw some of its best works during the 1950s and 1960s, also sometimes referred to as the "Golden age of Indian cinema."

As of 2004, it was run by Dutt's son - Arun Dutt, who wrote and directed the film Khule Aam (1992). The company has been defunct since at least 2017 per the Ministry of Corporate Affairs.

Filmography (Director)
1951 Baazi
1953 Baaz
1954 Aar-Paar
1955 Mr. & Mrs. '55
1957 Pyaasa
1959 Kaagaz Ke Phool
1960 Chaudhvin Ka Chand
1962 Sahib Bibi Aur Ghulam
1966 Baharen Phir Bhi Aayengi
1968 Shikar
1969 Chanda Aur Bijli
1984 Bindiya Chamkegi

References

External links
 Photo Album from Guru Dutt Films Pvt. Ltd. at The Telegraph.

Indian film studios
Guru Dutt
1955 establishments in Bombay State
1955 establishments in India
2017 disestablishments in India
Defunct companies based in Mumbai
Film production companies based in Mumbai
Film studios in Mumbai
Indian companies established in 1955
Indian companies disestablished in 2017
Privately held companies of India